1919 Eternal (also stylized as 1919★Eternal) is the third studio album by American heavy metal band Black Label Society. It was released on March 5, 2002 and was written for Zakk Wylde's father.

Writing
Five songs from the album sessions were written by Zakk Wylde for Ozzy Osbourne's album Down to Earth. Osbourne rejected the songs because they were "too Black Label", so Wylde kept them for this album. The songs were "Bleed for Me", "Life, Birth, Blood, Doom", "Demise of Sanity", an alternate piano version of "Bridge to Cross", and a demo called "Find a Way". The latter two were never released. These original demo songs featured drummer Christian Werr, a friend of Wylde's who happened to be in the right place at the right time to record the tracks. Later, when Wylde went to re-record these demos for 1919 Eternal, Christian's drum tracks were used for "Bleed for Me", "Life, Birth, Blood, Doom", and "Demise of Sanity", which is why Craig Nunenmacher does not appear on these songs.

Artwork
The album artwork is based on a German Nazi propaganda poster used to recruit Dutchmen into the Schutzstaffel (SS).

Track listing

Note: The 15th track is an unlabeled bonus track on the Japanese edition of the album, "Speedball" reversed.

Credits
Zakk Wylde – vocals, guitars, bass
Robert Trujillo – bass on "Demise of Sanity" and "Life, Birth, Blood, Doom"
Craig Nunenmacher – drums

Additional personnel
Christian Werr – drums (tracks 1, 3, 4)

Production
Produced by Zakk Wylde
Associate producer – Eddie Mapp
Engineered by Eddie Mapp and Sam Storey, assisted by Lou Michaels and Kent Hitchcock
Editing by Kent Huffnagle
Mastered by Ron Boustead
Management – Bob Ringe (Survival Management)
A&R – Paul Bibeau, Tami Fukatami
Art concept – Zakk Wylde
Art direction and design – Zakk Wylde and Peter Tsakiris (Drunken Monkey Studios)
Illustrations – Adam Guyot (Eternal Art Tattoo, Canyon County, California)
Photography – Maryanne Bilham

Charts

References

Additional sources

2002 albums
Black Label Society albums
Spitfire Records albums